Nilaave Vaa is a 1998 Indian Tamil-language romantic drama film directed by A. Venkatesh and produced by K. T. Kunjumon. The film stars Vijay and Suvalakshmi in the main lead roles, while Sanghavi, Raghuvaran and Manivannan play other supporting roles. The film released on 14 August 1998 and was a decent hit at the box office. "Nee Kaatru Naan Maram" is a popular melody number in the film.

Plot
Siluvai is the son of Cruz. They are Tamil Christians living in a fishing village. In another town, Perumaal is the father to Sangeetha and Gauri. Sangeetha comes to the small fishing village. Siva is proposed (and later engaged) to marry her. However, Gauri falls in love with Siva's friend, and after hearing that Perumal does not want to accept the Hindu-Christian marriage, she decides to elope with her lover. This leads to the breakup of Sangeetha and Siluvai's love affair. However, Siva, upon hearing Siluvai's story, gives a great speech to the villagers and unites Siluvai and Sangeetha.

Cast

Production
This low-budget production was jointly produced on Vijay's home banner and K T Kunjumon who was still reeling under the failure of Ratchagan (1997). Initially Rakshana was signed on as heroine but was subsequently replaced by Suvalakshmi. Mansoor Ali Khan had signed to be the villain in Nilaave Vaa, but the actor later returned the advance of 50,000 and took back his 40 days of call sheets, with Anandaraj consequently replacing him.

Release
A critic from Indolink.com concluded that the film was "not impressive", while mentioning that "Vijay rocked as usual" and Raghuvaran too "has given a good performance as usual". Ananda Vikatan gave the film a score of 37 out of 100.

Soundtrack

The film score and the soundtrack were composed by Vidyasagar. The lyrics were written by Vairamuthu.

References

External links
 

1998 films
1998 romantic drama films
Indian romantic drama films
1990s Tamil-language films
Films scored by Vidyasagar
Films directed by A. Venkatesh (director)